The José Fontán School (Spanish: Escuela José Fontán) is a historic early 20th-century school located in Morovis Pueblo, the administrative and historic center of the municipality of  Morovis, Puerto Rico. The school building was added to the National Register of Historic Places on August, 2012 due to its architectural importance as a prime example of the Late 19th and Early 20th Century American Movements architecture, particularly the Mission/Spanish Revival style, under the Early Twentieth Century Schools in Puerto Rico TR. The building was designed by Puerto Rican architect Rafael Carmoega and by Joseph O'Kelly from the Puerto Rico & American Insurance Co.

See also 
 National Register of Historic Places listings in central Puerto Rico

References 

School buildings on the National Register of Historic Places in Puerto Rico
School buildings completed in 1928
1928 establishments in Puerto Rico
Late 19th and Early 20th Century American Movements architecture
Morovis, Puerto Rico
Mission Revival architecture in Puerto Rico